Seattle Repertory Theatre (familiarly known as "The Rep") is a major regional theatre located in Seattle, Washington, at the Seattle Center. It is a member of Theatre Puget Sound and Theatre Communications Group. Founded in 1963, it is led by Artistic Director Braden Abraham and Managing Director Jeffrey Herrmann. It received the 1990 Regional Theatre Tony Award.

History

1960s

The first home of the Seattle Rep was the Seattle Playhouse, built as part of the fair grounds for the 1962 Century 21 Exposition, Seattle's 1962 World's Fair. The building, extant as of 2009, was renovated in 1987 as a home for the Intiman Theatre. Actor Hal Holbrook had appeared at the Playhouse during the fair, and is believed to be the person who suggested it as a home for a repertory theater company. Seattle businessman and arts patron Bagley Wright and others raised money and recruited artistic leadership to found what became the Seattle Repertory Theater ("The Rep"). Stuart Vaughan was the founding artistic director and directed the first production, King Lear, which opened the new company's first season on November 14, 1963. The original acting company included Seattle native Marjorie Nelson and a young associate member from the University of Washington, John Gilbert. Both went on to become mainstays of Pacific Northwest theater. Donald Foster came aboard as executive director in 1964. The first summer "Theater-in-the-Park" production was The Taming of the Shrew. The first Northwest tour included Twelfth Night and Ah, Wilderness! by Eugene O'Neill. Peter Donnelly joined The Rep on a Ford Foundation grant as a management intern.  In 1966, Allen Fletcher became The Rep's second artistic director.  The "Off-Center" series (held at other local theaters outside Seattle Center) focused on contemporary works. The first of "Off-Center" production, in 1967, featured The Death of Bessie Smith  and The American Dream, two one-act plays by Edward Albee. The Rep was invited to the Bergen International Festival in 1968.

1970s
In 1970, Peter Donnelly became producing director, and W. Duncan Ross became artistic director.  In 1972, The Rep's artistic role in the state was acknowledged with the Washington State Governor's Arts Award.  That same year was the beginning of "Rep ‘n' Rap", a summer tour program featuring Thurbermania. The following year, there was a special presentation of Promenade All directed by Hume Cronyn. "The 2nd Stage" series began a year later with Max Frisch's Biography. In 1975, a tour of the western states included Seven Keys to Baldpate by George M. Cohan. Private funding and a citywide bond issue raised $5.8 million for a new theater, which was begun in 1977 and completed in 1983. The first "Mobile Outreach Bunch" (MOB) toured Washington and Idaho schools with The Energy Show, launching The Rep's education programs in 1979.  John Hirsch joined as consulting artistic director with Daniel Sullivan as resident director that same year, and "Plays-in-Progress," initiated by Daniel Sullivan, began developing new plays.

1980s
In 1981, Daniel Sullivan became artistic director and the Seattle Repertory Organization held the first "Elegant Elephant Sale", an event that continued for nearly two decades.  On December 29, ground was broken for the new Bagley Wright Theatre, which opened in 1983 with the world premiere of Michael Weller's The Ballad of Soapy Smith, directed by Robert Egan. In 1984, Herb Gardner's I'm Not Rappaport starring Harold Gould, Cleavon Little and David Strathairn opened prior to its Broadway run.  That year also saw the start of "Dollar Theatre" with Big and Little (selections from Botho Strauß).  In 1985, Benjamin Moore was appointed The Rep's third managing director. In 1988, The Rep premiered Bill Irwin's Largely/New York and Richard Greenberg's Eastern Standard. The following year Wendy Wasserstein's Pulitzer Prize winning The Heidi Chronicles premiered there.

1990s
In 1990, The Rep was given a Tony Award for Outstanding Regional Theatre. Inspecting Carol, developed by Daniel Sullivan, Stephanie Hagarty and the SRT company, premiered as part of the "Stage 2" productions in 1991.  That same year Conversations With My Father by Herb Gardner premiered, and Inspecting Carol went on national tour the year after.  The premieres of London Suite by Neil Simon and The Sisters Rosensweig by Wendy Wasserstein took place in 1994.  The following year, in collaboration with Tom Hulce and Jane Jones, The Rep developed The Cider House Rules, adapted by Peter Parnell from John Irving's novel, which was then presented as part of the 'New Play Workshop Series'.  In 1996, the Leo Kreielsheimer ("Leo K") Theatre opened after a successful fund-raising drive.  Sharon Ott became the artistic director in 1997.  That year, in conjunction with the Leonardo exhibit at the Seattle Art Museum, The Notebooks of Leonardo da Vinci, written and directed by Mary Zimmerman, was staged in the new Leo Kreielsheimer Theatre (Leo K). Sisters Matsumoto by Philip Kan Gotanda premiered in 1999, followed by the first "Stars and Stories" special event, featuring readings by community artists and leaders, for the benefit of SRT's education programs.

2000s
Lily Tomlin's one-woman show by Jane Wagner, The Search for Signs of Intelligent Life in the Universe, played at The Rep prior to its engagement on Broadway.  In 2001, The Rep led a consortium of local theaters in presenting Peter Brook's Hamlet in the Mercer Arts Arena.  That same year, Daniel Sullivan returned to direct Proof, for which he won the Tony Award on Broadway, launching its national tour, and a $15 million "Endowment Campaign" under the leadership of Chap Alvord and Janet True was also announced.  The 40th Anniversary Season was celebrated in 2003.  David Esbjornson became artistic director in 2005. Ping Chong's Cathay: Three Tales of China, Ariel Dorfman's Purgatorio and Restoration Comedy, by Amy Freed, (which went on to be nominated for Best New Play by the American Theatre Critics Association) were among the premieres in 2006.  That year also saw a tribute to August Wilson, featuring performances from all ten of his plays. Esbjornson departed in summer 2008, replaced in 2009 by Jerry Manning.

2010s
In 2012, The Rep celebrated their 50th anniversary season. In 2014, Braden Abraham became the 10th Artistic Director after the death of Jerry Manning. The next year, Jeffrey Herrmann became the fifth managing director. In 2017, the final show of the season was David Byrne's Here Lies Love, which required removal of the entire main floor seating area of the Bagley Wright Theatre in order to fit the format of the production.

Education programs

In 2007, Seattle Repertory Theatre started the program "Bringing Theatre into the Classroom" (BTiC), a partnership project with Seattle Children's Theatre and Book-It Repertory Theatre designed to help K–12 teachers integrate theater into their curricula. The program was made possible through a grant of $75,000 from the National Endowment for the Arts. The theater also has an internship program for college students.

Productions

2006–2007
Bagley Wright Theatre
 Doubt by John Patrick Shanley; Director: Warner Shook
 The Great Gatsby by F. Scott Fitzgerald, Adapted by Simon Levy; Director: David Esbjornson
 The Lady From Dubuque by Edward Albee; Director: David Esbjornson
 Fire on the Mountain by Randal Myler and Dan Wheetman
 Gem of the Ocean by August Wilson; Director: Phylicia Rashad

Leo K Theatre
 Thom Pain (based on nothing) by Will Eno; Director: Jerry Manning
 Memory House by Kathleen Tolan; Director: Allison Narver
 Blue Door by Tanya Barfield; Director: Leigh Silverman
 My Name is Rachel Corrie by Alan Rickman and Katharine Viner; Director: Braden Abraham

2005–2006
Bagley Wright Theatre
 The King Stag by Carlo Gozzi, Adapted by Shelley Berc and Andrei Belgrader
 Purgatorio by Ariel Dorfman
 Restoration Comedy by Amy Freed
 Radio Golf by August Wilson
 Private Lives by Noël Coward
 Tuesdays with Morrie by Jeffrey Hatcher & Mitch Albom

Leo K Theatre
 Cathay: 3 Tales of China by Ping Chong and Shaanxi Folk Art Theatre
 9 Parts of Desire by Heather Raffo

PONCHO Forum
Women Playwrights Festival
 The Pork Chop Wars by Laurie Carlos
 My Wandering Boy by Julie Marie Myatt
 Twenty-six Miles by Quiara Alegria Hudes
 Scooping the Darkness Empty by Alva Rogers

2004–2005
Bagley Wright Theatre
 Anna in the Tropics by Nilo Cruz
 Take Me Out by Richard Greenberg
 Noises Off by Michael Frayn
 Ma Rainey's Black Bottom by August Wilson
 The Secret in the Wings adapted by Mary Zimmerman
 The Constant Wife by W. Somerset Maugham

Leo K Theatre
 Bad Dates by Theresa Rebeck
 The Chosen by Chaim Potok and Aaron Posner

Special Presentation
 Kate Mulgrew in Tea at Five by Matthew Lombardo

PONCHO Forum
Women Playwrights Festival
 Sirius Rising by Gwendolyn Schwinke
 The Aerodynamics of Accident by Deborah Isobel Stein
 Courting Vampires by Laura Schellhardt
 Hardball by Victoria Stewart

Stages

Bagley Wright Theatre

The Bagley Wright Theatre, named in honour of The Rep's first board of trustees president, opened on October 13, 1983 with the world premiere of Michael Weller's The Ballad of Soapy Smith, directed by Robert Egan, and featuring a cast of Seattle actors including Dennis Arndt (in the title role), John Aylward, Frank Corrado, Paul Hostetler, Richard Riehle, Michael Santo, Marjorie Nelson, Ted D'Arms, Kurt Beattie, Clayton Corzatte, and William Ontiveros.  Also in the cast were Kevin Tighe and Kate Mulgrew. The Bagley Wright Theatre is a city-owned facility.

The theater has a proscenium stage and a seating capacity of 842 seats; of these, 566 are on the orchestra level and 290 in the mezzanine level. The center section of the orchestra level is 18 rows deep, in the center section, with 14 seats per row, plus 3–13 seats per row in 16 rows on each of the sides. There are, in addition, 12 locations for wheelchairs in the last row. The mezzanine level begins  from the stage,  and has 290 seats. Its center section has 7 rows, 14 seats per row; the sides have 8 rows, with 9–13 seats per row.

Leo K. Theatre
The Leo Kreielsheimer Theatre ("Leo K.") opened in December 1996 as The Rep's "second stage." The Leo K. was made possible in great part to a US$2 million gift from The Kreielsheimer Foundation, a US$1 million gift from then board chair Marsha S. Glazer, and the leadership of Capital Campaign chairs Ann Ramsay-Jenkins and Stanley Savage. There are 282 seats total: 192 on the orchestra level (including loge), plus 90 balcony and box seats. There are 5 wheelchair locations.

The orchestra seating consists of 139 seats in 9 rows, with 8–20 seats per row; the loge adds 51 seats, in 2 rows of 27 and 24 seats, respectively. The balcony provides an additional 88 seats, in 3 rows, with 29–30 seats per row; additionally, there are 4 box seats at balcony level.

PONCHO Forum
The PONCHO Forum has a capacity of 133 seats and is set up for general admission, with stadium seating.

References

External links
Seattle Repertory Theatre official website
Douglas Q. Barnett, The Seattle Repertory Theatre Affair by Douglas Q. Barnett, HistoryLink, June 25, 2009.

1963 establishments in Washington (state)
Culture of Seattle
Seattle Center
Theatres in Washington (state)
Theatre companies in Washington (state)
Tony Award winners
Regional theatre in the United States
Tourist attractions in Seattle
World's fair architecture in Seattle
Century 21 Exposition